Cyperus platystylis is a species of sedge that occurs in Southeast Asia and Australia.

The species was first formally described by the botanist Robert Brown in 1810.

See also
 List of Cyperus species

References

platystylis
Taxa named by Robert Brown (botanist, born 1773)
Plants described in 1810
Flora of the Northern Territory
Flora of Queensland
Flora of New South Wales
Flora of Papua New Guinea
Flora of Vietnam
Flora of Thailand